The two amphibious/ground reconnaissance assets of the United States Marine Corps, Division and Force Reconnaissance, are generally trained in the same aspect and environment of intelligence collection for a Marine Air Ground Task Force (MAGTF) Commander, regardless of their difference in tactical area of responsibility (TAOR). However, in light of their distinctive responsibilities in their assigned areas of operations—whereas Division Recon conducts close and distant operations, Force Recon conducts deep operations—these two separate reconnaissance assets manage their own training protocols to fit their mission-oriented objectives.

Preliminary requirements

Prerequisites for screening:

Updated and current physical
General Technical (GT) score of 105 or higher.
Physical Fitness Test 1st Class score
WSI (or WSB+ if applicable) swim qualification
Have 20/200 near visual acuity or visual acuity not to exceed 20/400 with a completed PRK eye surgery. Normal color vision is recommended, but not required provided the Marine can complete a vivid red and vivid green recognition test.
18 months minimum remaining on current enlistment contract upon completion of the basic reconnaissance course
Be able to obtain a "Secret" security clearance
Have completed the infantry course at the Infantry Training Battalion, School of Infantry

Selection
Becoming a qualified Reconnaissance Marine  starts at the recon selection, or screening board, whether for assignment to Radio Recon,  Scout Snipers,  Division Recon,  or Force Recon. The screening process tests potential recon candidates in their combat swimming skills,  physical stamina and endurance; it is a 48-hour event that is held on the last Thursday of each month at either MCB Camp Pendleton or MCB Camp Lejeune; the FMF Reconnaissance and all the organic division reconnaissance assets conduct their own distinct selection process. Force Recon held their screening board at Camp Horno and near Las Flores on Camp Pendleton.

If failed, the Marines are encouraged to try the screening process again later.  Any candidate may also voluntarily dropout at any time during the screening process and retake the test later. Multiple screening attempts are common before succeeding.  Division recon Marines had to retake the Force Recon's indoc if they were to change from a division-level to a force-level command, regardless of their prior qualifications.

Because Marines are amphibious by nature, the candidates begin with a  underwater swim. The candidates also must conduct a deep water rifle retrieval.  The mock rifle is normally a rubber model of the service rifle ("rubber duck"); 10lb pool bricks are sometimes used instead by the Force Recon's selection board. The candidates would then have to carry the concrete block to the surface and swim it to a designated spot.

Next is a  tower jump into water with full combat gear, followed by 30 minutes of treading water.  Additional tests include five-minute flotation with trousers (removed and turned into improvised flotation aids) and a timed  swim.  After the pool screening is completed, the candidates run in formation down to the red course to perform a physical fitness test. They are required to obtain a 1st Class score of 225 or higher.

The next day, the candidates run an obstacle course a few times.  The candidates are judged on their effort and method of attempting the "O" Course, not by how fast they complete it. The last event in the selection and screening board is a run with a plastic rifle and a field pack containing a  sand bag.  They are expected to maintain a pace of four- to five-miles per hour.  The Division Recon requires the candidates to run an  course; the FMF Recon demanded an additional  "boots and utes" ruck sack run over the hills of Las Flores and down along the beach.  Failure to maintain this pace results in the candidate being dropped.  Once the recon Marine candidates pass all physical and evaluation tests,  they are given a psychological screening test and an interview.

They will then be interviewed by the recon command's staff; the officers are interviewed by the company commander, the enlisted Marines are interviewed by the company sergeant major and other staff non-commissioned officers.

In 2007, the Marine Corps folded the recon screening process into the initial phases of the Basic Reconnaissance Course.

Indoctrination

Before 2004, all potential recon Marine candidates were placed in Recon Indoctrination Program, or RIP.  In RIP, the candidates are given further training in patrolling, amphibious reconnaissance,  communications and land orientation which warmed-up the Marines before attending the rigorous and demanding Basic Reconnaissance Course  (BRC).  It was considered to be the Marines' equivalent of [Navy SEAL's]  "Hell Week".   Sometimes Marines in RIP would remain in the platoon for weeks or possibly months; until there were openings in processing for the BRC syllabus.

Since the Marine Corps do not receive the appropriated funds to build the proper training facilities that would accommodate the recon Marines' specialized training, the Corps opted to use the Army's and Navy's training functions instead.  This led to complications because the Marine training liaisons had to set up training agendas to meet the cross-service schools' class schedules.  It has been known to take weeks or months, depending on the training quota that was able to be met.

However, due to changes made recently, Marines who wish to join the reconnaissance community must first complete the School of Infantry's Rifleman Course prior to being assigned to the 'Marines Awaiting Recon Training' (MART) platoon.
Nonetheless, both the Indoctrination programs of RIP and MART were/are designed to prepare the recon candidates for the upcoming Basic Reconnaissance Course, which introduces them to the amphibious reconnaissance community.

Accession Pipeline

The  Accession Pipeline is a series of schools that the Marines attend before being assigned their designated reconnaissance MOS.  It may take one or two schools, or it may take several, before they are fully qualified in their described Military Occupational Specialty or MOS. On average, it will take 1.5 to 2-years to train a fully qualified Marine Reconnaissance Operator.  Since the Marine Corps lacks the facilities, they usually outsource their training to other cross-service schools sponsored by the United States Army and Navy.

The 'primary' focus of qualifications is for Marines to be fully functional as the MOS 0321, Reconnaissance Man.  To obtain the proper designated MOS, they must attend the Basic Reconnaissance Course (BRC).  The BRC is required for both Division and Force Recon.

Those recon Marines that complete the Basic Airborne Course retain the MOS 0323, "Reconnaissance Man, Parachutist Qualified", those that complete the USMC Combatant Diver Course, have the MOS 0324, "Reconnaissance Man, Combatant Diver Qualified" and those having both qualifications, the MOS 0326, "Reconnaissance Man, Parachutist and Combatant Diver Qualified".

Before the Marine Corps adopted a new designated change of the billeted Reconnaissance MOS, the Marines retained a secondary (Special "B"-categorized) MOS that was to be implemented along with their primary MOS of 0321 (e.g. 0321/8654).  The MOS subtly changed respectively into primary designations over time (i.e. 8652 merged into 0323; 8653 into 0324; 8654 into 0326) without any further need to maintain a secondary MOS designation.

Normally, the division reconnaissance assets do not have a large portion of parachute and combat diver qualified recon Marines, but do have some designated by the division commanders if the situation permits.  The FMF's recon operators, however, are required to be parachutists and combat divers, since they are required to insert deeper into the battlespace by parachute or submarine insertions.

Division and Force Recon Marines must complete Level "C" of the Survival, Evasion, Resistance and Escape (SERE) School.  Level "C" SERE is a course intended for high risk personnel that are carrying top secret compartmented information and are of high risk of capture.

Advanced training

When slots become available and the FMF budget permits it, the recon Marines of both the division and force may attend other advanced courses from cross-service schools.  These schools may not be required but many of the recon Marines request approval from the company commander to become students for further training.

Here are the following schools that are attended, if available:

Marine Corps Combatant Diver Course*  — Navy Diving Salvage and Training Center, Naval Support Activity Panama City,  Florida
Survival, Evasion, Resistance and Escape  School* —  Navy Remote Training Sites; NAS North Island, CA or NAS Brunswick, ME
Army Airborne School* — Fort Benning,  GA
United States Army Static Line Jumpmaster School (Fort Benning, Georgia)
United States Army Ranger School (Fort Benning, Georgia)
Special Operations Training Group Schools (i.e. Urban Sniper, HRST, etc.)  (SOTG)* — One SOTG exists under each MEF; I MEF, II MEF, and III MEF.
Recon and Surveillance Leaders Course — Ranger School,  Fort Benning,  GA
Pathfinder Course  — Army Infantry School, Fort Benning,  or Army Air Assault School, Fort Campbell, Kentucky
Military Free Fall (John F. Kennedy Special Warfare Center) / Multi Mission Parachutist Course (CPS Coolidge, AZ)Military Free Fall  (Jumpmaster) School — John F. Kennedy Special Warfare Center and SchoolMountain Leaders (Summer/Winter) Course — Pickle Meadows, CAScout Sniper Course — School of Infantry (West), Camp Pendleton, CA; Camp Lejeune, NC;  Quantico, VA;  or MCB HawaiiMountain Sniper (Bridgeport, California)Reconnaissance Team Leader Course (Camp Pendleton, CA)Scout/Sniper Team Leader CourseMethods of Entry / Breacher (MCB Quantico, VA)Joint Terminal Attack Controller (Expeditionary Warfare Training Group Atlantic/Pacific)High Risk Personnel  (HRP) Course — MCB Quantico*'''  required for all members of Force Reconnaissance.

References

United States Marine Corps